Friedrich Bendixen (1864–1920) was an American-born German banker who made contributions to monetary theory. He was born in San Francisco, California in the United States, and received his education in Germany at Heidelberg and Leipzig. Bendixen was a banker in Hamburg, Germany.

Monetary theory of Bendixen
The supply of money should not increase faster than production, because as production increases, the ratio of the circulation of money (notes that acquire goods) and goods themselves should remain constant, otherwise prices and values would become unstable.

References

German bankers
Businesspeople from San Francisco
1864 births
1920 deaths